Luke Jensen and Murphy Jensen were the defending champions but lost in the quarterfinals to Ellis Ferreira and Jan Siemerink.

Mark Petchey and Danny Sapsford won in the final 6–7, 7–6, 6–4 against Neil Broad and Piet Norval.

Seeds

  Patrick Galbraith /  Andrei Olhovskiy (quarterfinals)
  Ellis Ferreira /  Jan Siemerink (semifinals)
  Javier Frana /  Rick Leach (first round)
  Kent Kinnear /  Dave Randall (quarterfinals)

Draw

External links
 1996 Nottingham Open Doubles draw

Nottingham Open
Nottingham Open - Doubles
1996 Nottingham Open